Rocket Singh: Salesman of the Year is a 2009 Indian Hindi-language comedy-drama film directed by Shimit Amin, written by Jaideep Sahni and produced by Aditya Chopra under the Yash Raj Films banner. Marking the reunion of Amin, Sahni and Aditya Chopra after Chak De! India (2007), it stars Ranbir Kapoor as the titular lead Harpreet S. Bedi, with D. Santosh, Gauhar Khan and Naveen Kaushik in the leads roles. Prem Chopra, Manish Chaudhari and debutante Shazahn Padamsee, daughter of Alyque Padamsee and Sharon Prabhakar, play supporting roles.

Plot 
Harpreet Singh Bedi (Ranbir Kapoor), a B. Com. graduate with approximately 39 percent marks, becomes a salesman with a big corporate computer assembly and service company, AYS, headed by MD Sunil Puri (Manish Chaudhari). Despite initial objections from sales head Nitin Rathore, Harpreet is taken in by Puri, and begins learning the tricks of the sales trade from Nitin. He is shown to live alone with his widowered grandfather P.S. Bedi (Prem Chopra), and a circle that comprises his best friends Sai Ram (Amol Parashar), the lawyer son of an IAS officer who wants Harpreet to pursue an MBA, and Aparna "Appy" Singh (Debi Dutta), a designer. Later, he is sent to his first major field visit, where manager S.P. Chaudhary (Rajesh Jais) asks for a kick-back. Disgruntled due to his honest nature, he drops a letter in the complaint box nearby, accusing Chaudhary. However, when Nitin and Puri strongly condemn his actions and threaten to fire him as Chaudhary is a huge client, he feels humiliated and is isolated by the other salespersons, who are enraged after their targets are raised due to Harpreet's actions; they throw paper airplanes onto him as an insult.

Harpreet is unable to do anything, but after the appointment of a new senior manager, is able to take software operator Girish "Giri" Reddy (D. Santosh) and receptionist Koena Shaikh (Gauahar Khan) into confidence. Koena gives him the lead to a customer, Sherena Khanna (Shazahn Padamsee), who lives within his previously assigned "sales zone". A fashion entrepreneur living with her colleague Ayesha, she is initially disappointed by Harpreet's pitch, but calms him down, and he agrees to help her. Quite soon, he realizes that sales success depends on customer satisfaction, meaning that bribery will not be necessary to secure contracts. After making concessions to Sherena, he decides to found a new enterprise, Rocket Sales Corporation, from within AYS, naming it after the paper airplanes thrown at him. With this, he decides to make Giri and Koena partners in the venture.

Rocket Sales Corporation is being managed from within the AYS offices, with Giri later revealing that the tea-server, Chotelal Mishra, has a knack for assembling computer parts; they decide to make him an equal partner too. Usually working at night, they are later discovered by Nitin, who is rather reluctantly admitted into the venture and becomes a partner; in the process, he gradually abandons some of the typical AYS tricks he usually played, including bribes. Meanwhile, with Puri's humiliation of him in Chaudhary's presence still fresh in his mind, Harpreet decides to lock horns with Puri, seeking to avenge his humiliation.

The five-member company targets previous clients of AYS, who were irritated with AYS's attitude, and soon enjoys a strong client reputation. The company soon becomes successful because of its dedication to excellent customer service. Although it does not make much profit, Rocket Sales Corporations is able to make a huge difference. AYS's sales start decreasing as many of the clients cancel their orders and place orders at Rocket Sales, which offers them better services. Harpreet starts a relationship with Sherena in the process.

Enraged over this success, as he coaxes Nitin to discover the truth in exchange for a promotion to the post of Vice-President, Puri moves quickly to attempt to contact the MD of Rocket Sales Corporation and in a phone conversation attempts to entice him to sell Rocket Sales Corporation to AYS, little realizing it is Harpreet, who not only rejects Puri's offer but claims that Rocket Sales Corporation will buy AYS Computers. Afraid of Puri's attempts, Harpreet's partners have a discussion and move their headquarters to Sherena's house, making her a partner in the process. After multiple failed attempts in locating the Rocket Sales Corporation office, Puri decides to call the number on Rocket Sales Corporation's brochures and the phone at the AYS reception desk begins to ring. Realizing the truth when he sees Giri picking up, he walks in on the team. 

After thoroughly insulting him and firing both him and his partners, Puri has Harpreet sign a contract handing over Rocket Sales to him for a final compensation of Re. 1. Despite the elimination of potential competition from Harpreet, who is in return barred from conducting any computer assembly and service business, however, AYS is unable to maintain Rocket Sales' commitment to customer satisfaction because of its cold and greedy personnel. Seeing his downfall in purchasing Rocket Sales, Puri visits Harpreet at his new job at Croma, an electronics store, and returns the contract to Harpreet in return for Re. 1. He also tells him never to become a businessman again, because he will fail again. However, this is not intended as an insult, but rather as a compliment; he implies that what made Harpreet so successful was his eschewing of 'normal' business practices such as kickbacks, false advertisement, and low wages.

As the story ends, it shows an interviewee visiting the Rocket Sales Corporation office building. The firm is implied to be very successful, with P.S. Bedi joining in as the accounts manager; it shows the former AYS employees, all partners of the business, and finally closes with Harpreet smiling genially at a desk, showing that in the long run, honesty and hard work are sound business practices.

Cast
 Ranbir Kapoor as Harpreet Singh Bedi 
 Gauahar Khan as Koena Sheikh
 Shazahn Padamsee as Sherena Khanna
 D. Santosh as Girish "Giri" Reddy
 Manish Chaudhari as Sunil Puri
 Naveen Kaushik as Nitin Rathore
 Neeraj Sood as Lalwani
 Mukesh S. Bhatt as Chhotelal Mishra
 Mokshad Dodwani as Taxi
 Bikramjeet Kanwarpal as Inamdar
 Rajesh Jais as S. P. Chaudhary
 Amol Parashar as Sai Ram
 Debi Dutta as Aparna "Appy" Singh
 Prem Chopra as P. S. Bedi, Harpreet's grandfather
 Kayaan Contractor as Ayesha, Sherena's colleague 
 Nidhi Oza as Vibha Ahuja
 Gireesh Sahedev as Wajahat
 Firdaus Mevawala as M. P. Sharma
 Akshat Kapil in a special appearance as Rocket Sales Corporation interviewee

Critical reception
Film critic Rachel Saltz of New York Times called it "a smart, focused Bollywood movie" and commended Ranbir Kapoor for "turning in a skillfully understated performance" while Anupama Chopra in her NDTV review gave it 3 out 5 stars.

Nikhat Kazmi in The Times of India gave 3 stars out 5. While The Economic Times review gave it a 4 stars out of 5 and called it, "one of the most rocking films of the year". An Outlook review by Namrata Joshi gave it 3 out of 5 stars, saying that the film "Marks a continuum and a departure from the middle-class cinema of Hrishikesh Mukherjee, Basu Chatterjee and Sai Paranjape." Rajeev Masand of CNN-IBN gave the movie 3.5 stars out of 5.

Many of the serial entrepreneurs called it "a learning-curve Bollywood movie for upcoming entrepreneurs", focusing on taking risks and building relationships with clients.

Soundtrack

The soundtrack is composed by Salim–Sulaiman, with lyrics by Jaideep Sahni.

Awards and nominations

References

External links
 Official website
 
 Rocket Singh: Salesman of the Year Bollywood Hungama

2009 films
2000s Hindi-language films
2009 comedy-drama films
2000s business films
Yash Raj Films films
Films about Sikhism
Indian business films
2009 comedy films
2009 drama films
Films directed by Shimit Amin
Films about salespeople